Vedraj Chauhan (born on 1 April 1961 in Jalandhar in India) is a retired Indian cricketer. He captained the Indian under-19 cricket team on three occasions.

References 

 

Railways cricketers
Punjab, India cricketers
Indian cricketers
North Zone cricketers
Central Zone cricketers
Cricketers from Jalandhar
1961 births
Living people
Wicket-keepers